PS Kota Singkawang stand for Persatuan Sepakbola Kota Singkawang is an Indonesian football club based in Singkawang, West Kalimantan. Club played at Liga 3 and their homeground is Kridasana Stadium.

References

Singkawang
Football clubs in Indonesia
Football clubs in West Kalimantan